Harlow Art Trust (HAT) is a registered charity based in Harlow, Essex that was set up in the 1950s to acquire and display sculptures. Having collected many works over the years it now comprises a nationally significant collection located throughout the town.  HAT was set up by the lead architect of Harlow New Town Frederick Gibberd. Gibberd wanted the New Town to be a place where people who might not normally have access to art could enjoy great sculptures by great artists on every street corner. Consequently, almost all of Harlow's sculpture collection is in the open air, in shopping centres, housing estates and parks around the town.

Notable sculptures

Harlow Council has produced a 'Sculpture Trail' for visitors to the town which features many of the sculptures held in the collection. These include:

 Henry Moore's Family Group (1954), which is in the foyer of the Civic Centre. When it was commissioned by the Harlow Art Trust it was one of Moore's first major public works. 
 Elisabeth Frink's Boar, in the Water Gardens. Was originally commissioned in concrete (1957) but was remade and cast in bronze in 1970. 
 Lynn Chadwick Trigon (1961) - bought in 1963.
 Auguste Rodin - Eve (1882). Was acquired from Musee Rodin in 1960. A companion piece to Adam, it was to be part of the sculptural project, The Gates of Hell, which remained unfinished at Rodin's death.
 Barbara Hepworth - Contrapunctal Forms (1951)
 Angela Godfrey - HAT has commissioned four sculptures by Godfrey: Grecian Urn: Two Vertical Forms (2000), We Are The Music Makers (2006), Flowing Onwards (2007), The Flame (2008)
 Sir Frederick Gibberd - Obelisk (1980).

Sculpture Town
On 26 March 2009 Harlow Council voted to approve a proposal made by Harlow Art Trust to rebrand Harlow Town as 'Harlow Sculpture Town'. This is to highlight the significant collection of public sculptures cited around the town.

The new title will be used on council and other tourist publications from the Summer of 2009 onwards, and aims to emulate the former name of Harlow (Harlow New Town). This not only celebrates the sculptures owned by Harlow Art Trust but other sculpture collections in Harlow, including those of the council, the Gibberd Garden and Parndon Mill.

In rebranding the town the aim of Harlow Art Trust is to associate Harlow with the name Sculpture Town as readily as the town of Hay-on-Wye is known as Booktown.

Gibberd Gallery
The Harlow Art Trust also runs The Gibberd Gallery (named in honour of Sir Frederick Gibberd). The trust has run the Gibberd Gallery since 2011 after taking it over from Harlow Council. The gallery houses the town's sculpture and permanent watercolour collection. One of its trustees is the sculptor Angela Godfrey.

See also
 List of public art in Harlow

References

British sculpture
Harlow
Culture in Essex